Nativity is a panel painting of c. 1420 by the Early Netherlandish painter Robert Campin, now in the Musée des Beaux-Arts de Dijon, France.  As often, the moment shown is the Adoration of the Shepherds. Harshly realistic, the Child Jesus and his parents are shown in poverty, the figures crowded in a small structure, with broken-down walls, and a thatched roof with a hole, the single space shared with animals. In this Campin abandons the traditional narrative.

The Virgin is presented as in her teens, Joseph as a much older man. Four angels hover above them, holding gifts. Two of them hold a banner with lettering addressed to midwives in the lower portion of the panel; it reads "Tangue puerum et sanabaris" (touch the child and you shall be healed). From the little record of Campin, he was a significant pioneer and innovator of painting, and here his appeal is to the poverty of the Holy Family. His skill with oil paint is reflected in the positioning of the central figures in the extreme foreground, giving the panel a very tight and focused feel, despite the highly detailed background details and landscape. The hut is slanted compared to the outline of the frame, a device later adopted by Rogier van der Weyden in his Bladelin Altarpiece.

Campin places a landscape complete with a view of a lake beyond of the stable, just above the two midwives. Reinforcing the idea of redemption, Salome is given a prominent position, facing outwards towards the viewer in the mid foreground.

Notes

Sources

Blum, Shirley Neilsen. "Early Netherlandish Triptychs: A Study in Patronage". Speculum, Volume 47, No. 2, April 1972
Campbell, Lorne. Van der Weyden. London: Chaucer Press, 2004. 
Rothstein, Bret. Sight and Spirituality in Early Netherlandish Painting. Cambridge University Press, 2005.

External links
 At the Musée des Beaux-Arts de Dijon (fr)

1420s paintings
Paintings by Robert Campin
Campin
Angels in art
Cattle in art
Campin